The Muzzle may refer to:

 The Muzzle (1938 film), a German film
 The Muzzle (1958 film), a West German film remake